Maria Susana "Toots" Vasquez Ople (born February 9, 1962) is a Filipino politician and advocate of Overseas Filipino Workers' (OFW) rights who is the first Secretary of the Department of Migrant Workers.

Biography
Susan Ople was born on February 9, 1962, the youngest of the seven children of Blas F. Ople and Susana Vasquez. Her father served as Labor Secretary/Minister during the Marcos regime. She served as chief of staff of the Office of her father Senator Blas Ople and later as chief of staff of the Department of Foreign Affairs when her father became its Secretary. In 2004, Ople was appointed as Undersecretary of the Department of Labor and Employment by President Gloria Macapagal Arroyo. She then ran for Senator in the 2010 Philippine elections but lost, ranking 34th out of 61 candidates.

Susan Ople is the founder and current president of the Blas Ople Policy Center (BOPC) which assist distressed overseas Filipino workers (OFWS) in various parts of the world. To promote her advocacy, Ople co-anchors the popular daily radio show “Bantay OFW” at DZXL’s Tatak RMN network. She also has a Saturday radio program on DWIZ 882 AM called “Global Pinoy”.

Ople ran again for Senator under the Nacionalista Party in the 2016 Philippine Elections. She advocated to pass laws that would help advance the welfare of OFWs while at the same time highlighting key issues that affect them today. She was endorsed by four of five presidential candidates, namely Miriam Defensor-Santiago, Jejomar Binay, Grace Poe (of which Ople was part of a senatorial slate), and Rodrigo Duterte. She lost, placing 22nd out of 50 candidates.

In 2022, President Bongbong Marcos appointed Ople as secretary of the newly-created Department of Migrant Workers. In 29 November 2022, her appointment is confirmed by the congressional Commission on Appointments, making her the first secretary of the newly-created executive department.

Advocacies

OFW Rights
Ople's main line of advocacy during her career is focused on Overseas Filipino Workers. She is known for advocating the rights of OFWs, especially those being maltreated in foreign countries. She opposed the death sentence given by Indonesia to a Filipino OFW who was tricked to carry drugs into the country. She also advocated for the release of numerous OFWs imprisoned in the Middle East.

LGBT Rights
Despite not getting a senate seat during the 2016 Senate elections, she continued to advocate the passage of the SOGIE Equality Bill which penalize discrimination based on sexual orientation and gender identity. She wrote pieces of work in favor of the LGBT community.

Labor Rights
She was a former labor undersecretary of the Philippine government. Her advocacies on labor range from the abolishment of contractualization to better employment opportunities for the people, especially the youth sector which face a sudden surge in unemployment due to a massive population boom.

Rule of Law
Being a daughter of the late justice Blas Ople, she advocates for the rule of law and the strengthening of the country's justice system. She is also advocating for the abolishment of political dynasties, which should have been abolished long ago as enshrined in the Philippine Constitution.

References

|-

1962 births
Living people
Nacionalista Party politicians
Place of birth missing (living people)
Arroyo administration personnel
Bongbong Marcos administration cabinet members
University of Santo Tomas alumni
Harvard Kennedy School alumni
Women members of the Cabinet of the Philippines